José Joaquín Chaverri Sievert (born August 30, 1949) is a Costa Rican diplomat. In 2005 he was appointed Director of Foreign Policy of the Ministry of Foreign Affairs. He has also served as Costa Rican ambassador to Germany, Denmark and Czechoslovakia.

References

Costa Rican politicians
1949 births
Living people
Costa Rican diplomats
Ambassadors of Costa Rica to Czechoslovakia
Ambassadors of Costa Rica to Denmark
Ambassadors of Costa Rica to Germany